MAP1 may refer to:
 MAP1A
 MAP1B